Ishimovo (İşem; , Ešym) is a rural locality (a village) in Baymurzinsky Selsoviet, Mishkinsky District, Bashkortostan, Russia. The population was 193 as of 2010. There are 3 streets.

Geography 
Ishimovo is located 59 km northwest of Mishkino (the district's administrative centre) by road. Ilikovo is the nearest rural locality.

References 

Rural localities in Mishkinsky District